San Francisco Naciff Airport is a public use airport near Naciff in the Beni Department of Bolivia.

See also

Transport in Bolivia
List of airports in Bolivia

References

External links 
OpenStreetMap - Naciff
OurAirports - Naciff
Fallingrain - Naciff Airport
Bing Maps - Naciff

Airports in Beni Department